Vico or de Vico may refer to:

People
 Prefetti di Vico, a 10th- to 15th-century Italian noble family

Surname
 Enea Vico (1523–1567), Italian engraver
 Francesco de Vico (1805–1848), Italian astronomer
 Francesco Vico (fl. 17th century), Italian Baroque painter
 Francisco José Vico Vela, Spanish computer scientist and engineer
 George Vico (1923–1994), American baseball player 
 Giambattista Vico (1668–1744), Italian philosopher, historian, and jurist
 Jovica Vico (born 1978), Bosnian footballer
 Stefan Vico (born 1995), Montenegrin footballer
 Gleen Alver Vico (born 1983), Aircraft Researcher

Given name or nickname
 Vico (footballer) (born 1996), Vinicius Duarte, Brazilian football forward
 Vico C (born 1971), Puerto Rican rapper
 Vico Consorti (1902–1979), Italian sculptor
 Vico Haddad (born 1960), Israeli footballer and manager
 Vico Hui (born 1965/6), Hong Kong businessman
 Vico Magistretti (1920–2006), Italian industrial designer
 Vico Meien (born 1998), German footballer
 Vico Merklein (born 1977), German paracyclist
 Vico Mossa (1914–2003), Italian architect and writer
 Vico Sotto (born 1989), Filipino politician
 Vico Thai, Australian actor
 Vico Torriani (1920–1998), Swiss actor and singer
 Vico Zeljković (born 1988), Bosnian businessman and football executive
 Christopher Paul Neil (born 1975), known by Interpol as Vico, convicted child molester

Places
 Vico, Corse-du-Sud, a French commune
 Lake Vico, a lake in northern Lazio, Italy
 Vico Pancellorum, a village close to Bagni di Lucca
 Vico Canavese, a frazione in the comune' of Valchiusa
 Vico del Gargano
 Vico Equense
 Vico nel Lazio

In space
 De Vico (crater), a lunar crater named after Francesco de Vico
 20103 de Vico, a main-belt asteroid
 Comet de Vico, several comets discovered by Francesco de Vico

Beverage
 Vi-Co, the brand name of a chocolate malt drink

See also
 Vicco, Kentucky, US